The fifth season of The Hills, an American reality television series, consists of 20 episodes and was broadcast on MTV. Part I was aired from April 6, 2009, until May 31, 2009, while Part II was aired from September 29, 2009, until December 1, 2009. The season was filmed primarily in Los Angeles, California, with additional footage in Crested Butte, Colorado, Oahu, Hawaii, and Las Vegas, Nevada. Part I was filmed from January to April 2009, while Part II was filmed from May to November 2009. The executive producer was Liz Gateley.

The Hills focuses on the lives of Lauren Conrad, Audrina Patridge, and Heidi Montag. During Part I, Montag and her boyfriend Spencer Pratt nearly ended their turbulent relationship before deciding to marry. The mid-season finale saw Conrad attend the wedding and reconcile with Montag before making her final appearance on the series. During Part II, Conrad was replaced by fellow former Laguna Beach: The Real Orange County cast member Kristin Cavallari, whose interest in Justin Brescia resulted in a feud with Patridge.

Despite widespread rumors that Conrad wished to leave the series upon the conclusion of the fourth season, producers persuaded her to film ten additional episodes in the beginning of the fifth season to close her storylines. After Cavallari was announced as her replacement, ten additional episodes were ordered to the season. Though her contract confirmed the production of two seasons beyond the fifth, the series ended upon the conclusion of the sixth season in July 2010.

Synopsis
The fifth season continues as Lauren Conrad's distaste of estranged friend Heidi Montag's boyfriend Spencer Pratt inhibits a reconciliation between the women. Montag becomes dismayed after learning that Pratt has begun a flirtatious relationship with a local bartender Stacie Hall. After he reluctantly agrees to her ultimatum of attending couples' therapy, they became engaged and decide to marry. Under the impression that their relationship has been repaired, Montag provided Conrad with an invitation to the ceremony, though Conrad initially rejects the offer, feeling that her attendance would justify a relationship that she disapproved of. After receiving a telephone apology from Pratt regarding earlier sex tape rumors, Conrad makes her final appearance on the series during the mid-season finale, where she attended the nuptials and reconciled with Montag.

The second half of the season continues as Kristin Cavallari assumes the lead position in Conrad's absence. She becomes involved in a feud with Audrina Patridge after beginning a relationship with her ex-boyfriend Justin Brescia. Upon returning from their honeymoon, Montag expresses an interest in beginning a family, while Pratt is adamantly against having children. The season concludes as Patridge severs ties with Brescia, while Montag and Pratt decide against having children for the time being, instead choosing to wait for the coming years.

Cast

During the fifth season, Lauren Conrad serves as the series' narrator and focal point. She continues to attend the Fashion Institute of Design & Merchandising and work for Kelly Cutrone's PR firm People's Revolution. Audrina Patridge remains Conrad's close friend, and is employed by Epic Records. Heidi Montag is depicted as Patridge's friend, continues to mend her estranged relationship with former housemate Conrad, and holds a position with Bolthouse Productions.

As in seasons' past, the aforementioned women's storylines are largely developed by a number of supporting cast members. Lo Bosworth is Conrad's best friend and housemate. Montag and her boyfriend Spencer Pratt are disliked by the majority of the cast, who look to disassociate themselves with the couple's antagonistic antics. However, Conrad is friends with their sisters Holly Montag and Stephanie Pratt, through whom Montag attempts to revive their friendship. Brody Jenner, Frankie Delgado, and Doug Reinhardt are mutual friends with the majority of the cast.

Justin Brescia and Jayde Nicole serve as Patridge and Jenner's respective on-again/off-again partners. Stacie Hall was depicted as a flirtatious bartender that strained Montag and the male Pratt's relationship. Charlie Smith was shown to be close friends with the male Pratt. In the workplace, Cutrone is featured as Conrad's boss, while Brent Bolthouse serves as Montag's boss. Kimberly Brandon and Chiara Kramer are shown as Montag and Patridge's respective co-workers and friends.

After Kristin Cavallari became the series' focal point in the second half of the season, the dynamic between cast members was adjusted in response to Conrad's absence. Cavallari herself was friends with Montag and Hall. Patridge became Cavallari's nemesis after their feud began, while Brescia became Cavallari's brief love interest. The storyline was also modified to depict Jenner as Cavallari's former boyfriend, and began to portray a romantic tension.

Critical reception

Scripting allegations
The Hills was often criticized for appearing to fabricate much of its storyline, and was particularly criticized during the fifth season. One source of suspicion arose when Conrad was shown to be moving out of her house the day prior to Montag and Pratt's nuptials. However, Conrad and Bosworth had actually left the property several months prior in January, leading to speculation that addressing the wedding as "the next day" was pre-planned.

After leaving The Hills, Conrad appeared on The View in June 2009, where she was asked how she felt about her apology from Pratt involving the sex tape rumors. She replied, "To be perfectly honest, I wasn't on the other line of that call. That was filmed and I wasn't on the other end, so I didn't know about it until, so, no, I never did get an apology. He's lying". At Montag and Pratt's wedding, it was depicted on the series as if Conrad and Cavallari were displeased with each other's presence, though the latter commented that they gave each other "a big hug, and that's it".

Cavallari also stated that when she joined The Hills, "It's work! And drama sells. I think that's why they're bringing me in, because I know what works". Cavallari later told Ryan Seacrest that her relationships with Jenner and Brescia were fabricated.

U.S. television ratings
The second half of the fifth season, also Cavallari's first episode as the lead, premiered to 2.1 million viewers, suffering a 30-percent drop from the premiere of the first half.

Episodes

References 

5
2009 American television seasons
Split television seasons